The 2022 CONCACAF Women's U-20 Championship Qualifiers, hosted by Curaçao, took place on 13–17 September 2021. 13 teams competed for four berths directly into the knockout stage of the 2022 CONCACAF Women's U-20 Championship final tournament.

Teams
The 41 CONCACAF teams were ranked based on the CONCACAF Women's Under-20 Ranking as of 31 March 2020, and 28 entered the competition for the 2022 CONCACAF Women's U-20 Championship final tournament. The highest-ranked 16 entrants advanced directly to the group stage of the final tournament, while the other 12 entrants participated in qualifying. The four group winners in qualifying advance directly into the knockout stage of the final tournament.

Notes

Draw
The draw for the Qualifiers took place on 24 June 2021, at the CONCACAF headquarters in Miami. The 13 entrants were drawn into one group of four and three groups of three. Dominica (drawn into Group A) and Martinique (drawn into Group B) withdrew before the start of the tournament. The Bahamas later replaced Martinique in Group B.

Based on the CONCACAF Women's Under-20 Ranking as of 31 March 2020, the 13 teams were distributed into three pots:

(W): Withdrew after draw

Qualifying stage
The winners each group will advance to the knockout stage of the final tournament.

Tiebreakers
The ranking of teams in each group is determined as follows (Regulations Article 12.4):
Points obtained in all group matches (three points for a win, one for a draw, zero for a loss);
Goal difference in all group matches;
Number of goals scored in all group matches;
Points obtained in the matches played between the teams in question;
Goal difference in the matches played between the teams in question;
Number of goals scored in the matches played between the teams in question;
Fair play points in all group matches (only one deduction could be applied to a player in a single match):
Yellow card: −1 points;
Indirect red card (second yellow card): −3 points;
Direct red card: −4 points;
Yellow card and direct red card: −5 points;
Drawing of lots.

Group A

Group B

Group C

Group D

Goalscorers

References

External links

CONCACAF
Women's association football
CONCACAF Women's U-20 Championship qualification